Macrocera is a genus of predatory fungus gnats in the family Keroplatidae. There are at least 190 described species in Macrocera.

See also
 List of Macrocera species

References

External links

 

Keroplatidae
Articles created by Qbugbot
Sciaroidea genera
Taxa named by Johann Wilhelm Meigen